Luis Fernando Urías Figueroa (born June 3, 1997) is a Mexican professional baseball infielder for the Milwaukee Brewers of Major League Baseball (MLB). He made his MLB debut for the San Diego Padres.

Professional career

San Diego Padres
Urías signed with the San Diego Padres as an international free agent in December 2013. He made his professional debut in 2014 with the Rookie League Dominican Summer League Padres, and was promoted to the Rookie League Arizona League Padres after two games; in 45 total games between the two clubs in which he split his time between second base and third base, he batted .297 with 14 runs batted in (RBIs). In the winter of 2014–15 he played for the Yaquis de Obregon of the Mexican Pacific Winter League, batting .158 in 12 games. In 2015, he played for the Class A- Tri-City Dust Devils and the Class A Fort Wayne TinCaps, posting a combined .299 batting average with no home runs and  17 RBIs in 61 total games between the two teams. In the winter of 2015-16, he played again for the Yaquis de Obregon of the Mexican Pacific Winter League, batting .280 with no home runs and 11 RBIs in 36 games. Urías played primarily in 2016 for the Class A+ Lake Elsinore Storm, for whom in 120 games he batted .330 with five home runs (his first in the minor leagues), 52 RBIs, a .397 OBP, and an .836 OPS. In July he played in three games for the El Paso Chihuahuas of the Class AAA Pacific Coast League, batting 9-for-15 with one home run, as a brief replacement for players who were selected to the All-Star Futures Game. He won the California League Most Valuable Player Award.

Urías was chosen to play for the Mexico national baseball team in the 2017 World Baseball Classic. In 2017, he played for the San Antonio Missions of the Class AA Texas League, where as he split his time between second base and shortstop he posted a .296 batting average with three home runs, 38 RBIs, a .380 slugging percentage, and a .778 OPS. Urías entered 2018 ranked the #32 prospect in the minor leagues by Baseball America, #36 by major league baseball, and #74 by Baseball Prospectus.  He began the season with the El Paso Chihuahuas. After producing at a .296/.398/.447 clip over 120 games with the team, he was called up to the major leagues on August 28.

In 2018 with the San Diego Padres, Urías batted .208/.264/.354 with two home runs in 48 at-bats. On September 11 he suffered a left hamstring injury, ending his season.

Milwaukee Brewers
On November 27, 2019, the Padres traded Urías and Eric Lauer to the Milwaukee Brewers in exchange for Trent Grisham, Zach Davies, and cash considerations or a player to be named later. On July 6, 2020, it was announced that Urías had tested positive for COVID-19. As a result, Urías did not play until August 10. During the season, Urías hit .239/.308/.294 in 41 games.

On May 31, 2021, Urías recorded his first career walk-off hit off of Detroit Tigers reliever José Cisnero. Urías finished the 2021 season batting .249/.345/.445 with 23 home runs and 75 RBIs in 150 games.

On January 13, 2023, Urías agreed to a one-year, $4.7 million contract with the Brewers, avoiding salary arbitration.

Personal life 
Luis is the youngest child of María Trinidad Figueroa Esquer and Ramón Urías. His older brother is Ramón Urías, who is also an MLB infielder.

References

External links

1997 births
Living people
Arizona League Padres players
Baseball players from Sonora
Dominican Summer League Padres players
Mexican expatriate baseball players in the Dominican Republic
El Paso Chihuahuas players
Fort Wayne TinCaps players
Lake Elsinore Storm players
Major League Baseball second basemen
Major League Baseball players from Mexico
Mexican expatriate baseball players in the United States
Milwaukee Brewers players
Peoria Javelinas players
San Antonio Missions players
San Diego Padres players
Tri-City Dust Devils players
Yaquis de Obregón players
2017 World Baseball Classic players
2023 World Baseball Classic players
People from Magdalena de Kino